Balslev may refer to:

 Balslev, Ejby, a Danish parish in Ejby Municipality

People with the surname
 Harald Balslev (1867-1952), Danish writer and composer
 Lisbeth Balslev (born 1945), Danish operatic soprano

See also
 Balsley, a surname